M. R. Vijayabhaskar (also known as MRV) is an Indian politician and a member of the 15th Tamil Nadu Legislative Assembly. He was elected from Karur constituency as a candidate of the AIADMK. He inculcated the rule to carry driving licenses compulsory.

Jayalalithaa appointed Vijayabhaskar as Minister for Transport in May 2016. This was his first cabinet post in the Government of Tamil Nadu.

In Karur, Vijayabaskar suffered defeat with a margin of 12,448 to DMK's V. Senthil Balaji in 2021 Tamil Nadu Assembly elections.

References 

Tamil Nadu MLAs 2016–2021
State cabinet ministers of Tamil Nadu
All India Anna Dravida Munnetra Kazhagam politicians
Year of birth missing (living people)
Living people